The Supreme Court (French Cour Suprême) is the highest judicial body in Cameroon. As defined in Article V of the Constitution of Cameroon, the Supreme Court is above the courts of appeal and the tribunals. It is nominally independent of the executive and legislative branches of government, subject only to the oversight of the Higher Judicial Council. The justices are appointed by the president of Cameroon. The court is headquartered in Yaoundé.

The Supreme Court is an appellate court made up of three parts: the judicial, administrative, and audit benches. The judicial bench rules on standard cases appealed from the lower courts. the administrative bench handles cases involving the state, such as election disputes and appellate cases involving the government. This branch can hear such cases on the first instance. The audit bench takes cases relating to public accounts of public and semi-private entities. The Supreme Court may only rule on the constitutionality of law at the behest of the president of Cameroon. The body typically decides appeals only on point of law.

The Supreme Court was founded in 1961 to replace the Federal Court of Justice.

Notes

References
 "Background Note: Cameroon". October 2006. United States Department of State. Accessed 2 January 2007.
 "Cameroon". The World Factbook. United States Central Intelligence Agency. 12 December 2006. Accessed 20 December 2006.
 Christou, Theodora A., and Keir Starmer (2005). Human Rights Manual and Sourcebook for Africa. The British Institute of International and Comparative Law.
 Constitution of the Republic of Cameroon ( English and French versions). 18 January 1996. Accessed 4 January 2007.
 Fonge, Fuabeh P. (1997). Modernization without Development in Africa: Patterns of Change and Continuity in Post-Independence Cameroonian Public Service. Trenton, New Jersey: Africa World Press, Inc.

Law of Cameroon
Government of Cameroon
Cameroon
Yaoundé
1961 establishments in Cameroon
Courts and tribunals established in 1961